Romano-British Pottery was produced from the 1st through the 5th centuries AD in Britain, during the period of occupation by the Roman Empire. Before the invasion of the Romans, pottery in Britain was handmade and fired in a bonfire. The Romans introduced the new technology of fast potters wheels and kilns for firing. The newer manufacturing methods resulted in a pottery that was different from the previous period's pottery. Romano-British pottery has a thinner, harder and smoother fabric than both Iron Age (800 BC–100 AD) and Anglo-Saxon pottery (500–1066 AD).

List of Romano-British pottery  
This is a partial list of Romano-British pottery.

See also
Ancient Roman Pottery
Roman Britain
List of English medieval pottery

References

British pottery